1907 in sports describes the year's events in world sport.

American football
College championship
 College football national championship – Yale Bulldogs
Events
 For the first time, fans are entertained by a marching band during halftime of the University of Illinois game against the University of Chicago.

Association football
Egypt
Al Ahly SC founded in Cairo (24 April)
England
 The Football League – Newcastle United 51 points, Bristol City 48, Everton 45, Sheffield United 45, Aston Villa 44, Bolton Wanderers 44
 FA Cup final – The Wednesday 2–1 Everton at Crystal Palace, London
Germany
 National Championship – Freiburger FC 3–1 Viktoria Berlin at Mannheim
Scotland
 Scottish Football League – Celtic
 Scottish Cup final – Celtic 3–0 Hearts at Hampden Park
Turkey
 Fenerbahce SK founded in Istanbul (19 July)

Athletics
Marathon
 28 November — Johnny Hayes wins the inaugural Yonkers Marathon.

Australian rules football
VFL Premiership
 Carlton wins the 11th VFL Premiership – Carlton 6.14 (50) d South Melbourne 6.9 (45) at Melbourne Cricket Ground (MCG)

Bandy
International

Bandy was included in the winter games held in Helsinki, Finland, similar to the Nordic Games. Finland was represented by the club Polyteknikkojen Urheiluseura (PUS) but the winner of the competition was a combined team from Sweden, which defeated PUS as well as a team from St. Petersburg, Russia.

Sweden
 Swedish national championship inaugurated.
 Championship final – IFK Uppsala 4–1 IFK Gävle

Baseball
World Series
 8–12 October — Chicago Cubs (NL) defeats Detroit Tigers (AL) to win the 1907 World Series by 4 games to 0 with one tie
Events
 Winnipeg Maroons wins the Northern League Championship
Dominican Republic 
 Tigres del Licey, a famous professional baseball club in Dominican Republic, officially founded in Santo Domingo on November 7.

Boxing
Events
 8 May. Canadian Tommy Burns retains his world heavyweight boxing title by beating Philadelphia Jack O'Brien on points after 20 rounds in Los Angeles.
 Following two successful title defences in California, Burns travels to London, where he defeats British heavyweight champion Gunner Moir.
Lineal world champions
 World Heavyweight Championship – Tommy Burns
 World Light Heavyweight Championship – vacant
 World Middleweight Championship – vacant → Stanley Ketchel
 World Welterweight Championship – William "Honey" Mellody → Mike "Twin" Sullivan
 World Lightweight Championship – Joe Gans
 World Featherweight Championship – Abe Attell
 World Bantamweight Championship – Jimmy Walsh

Cricket
England
 County Championship – Nottinghamshire
 Minor Counties Championship – Lancashire II
 Most runs – Tom Hayward 2353 @ 45.25 (HS 161)
 Most wickets – Edward Dennett 201 @ 16.05 (BB 8–9)
 Wisden Cricketers of the Year – Albert Hallam, Reggie Schwarz, Frank Tarrant, Bert Vogler, Thomas Wass
Australia
 Sheffield Shield – New South Wales
 Most runs – Bert Hopkins 617 @ 56.09 (HS 171)
 Most wickets – Leonard Garnsey 32 @ 21.93 (HS 6–35)
India
 Bombay Presidency – Hindus
New Zealand
 Plunket Shield – Canterbury
South Africa
 Currie Cup – not contested
West Indies
 Inter-Colonial Tournament – Trinidad and Tobago

Cycling
Tour de France
 Lucien Petit-Breton (France) wins the 5th Tour de France

Figure skating
World Figure Skating Championships
 World Men's Champion – Ulrich Salchow (Sweden)
 World Women's Champion – Madge Syers-Cave (Great Britain)

Golf
Events
 Arnaud Massy (France) becomes the first overseas British Open champion
Major tournaments
 British Open – Arnaud Massy (France)
 US Open – Alec Ross
Other tournaments
 British Amateur – John Ball
 US Amateur – Jerome Travers

Horse racing
England
 Grand National – Eremon
 1,000 Guineas Stakes – Witch Elm
 2,000 Guineas Stakes – Slieve Gallion
 The Derby – Orby
 The Oaks – Glass Doll
 St. Leger Stakes – Wool Winder
Australia
 Melbourne Cup – Poseidon
Canada
 King's Plate – Kelvin
Ireland
 Irish Grand National – Sweet Cecil
 Irish Derby Stakes – Orby
United States
 Kentucky Derby – Pink Star
 Preakness Stakes – Don Enrique
 Belmont Stakes – Peter Pan

Ice hockey
Stanley Cup
 17–21 January — Kenora Thistles defeats Montreal Wanderers two games to none in a Stanley Cup challenge. Kenora, Ontario is the smallest town ever to win the Stanley Cup.
 16–18 March — Kenora Thistles defeats Brandon, Manitoba to win the Manitoba title and defends the Stanley Cup.
 23–25 March — Montreal Wanderers regains the Stanley Cup by defeating the Thistles two games to none in a rematch.
Events
 9 March — Montreal Wanderers wins the Eastern Canada Amateur Hockey Association (ECAHA) title.
 Stratford 14th Regiment defeats Kingston Frontenacs 8–6 to win Ontario Hockey Association title.

Motorsport

Rowing
The Boat Race
 16 March — Cambridge wins the 64th Oxford and Cambridge Boat Race

Rugby league
England
 Championship – Halifax
 Challenge Cup final – Warrington 17–3 Oldham at Wheater's Field, Broughton
 Lancashire League Championship – not contested
 Yorkshire League Championship – not contested
 Lancashire County Cup – Broughton Rangers 15–6 Warrington
 Yorkshire County Cup – Bradford F.C. 8–5 Hull Kingston Rovers
Australia
The newly formed New South Wales Rugby League conducts its first game of rugby: a match in Sydney between New Zealand and New South Wales

Rugby union
Home Nations Championship
 25th Home Nations Championship series is won by Scotland

Speed skating
Speed Skating World Championships
 Men's All-round Champion – none declared

Tennis
Events
 Norman Brookes (Australia) becomes the first overseas winner of the Wimbledon Men's Singles Championship
Australia
 Australian Men's Singles Championship – Horace Rice (Australia) defeats Harry Parker (Australia) 6–3 6–4 6–4
England
 Wimbledon Men's Singles Championship – Norman Brookes (Australia) defeats Arthur Gore (GB) 6–4 6–2 6–2
 Wimbledon Women's Singles Championship – May Sutton Bundy (USA) defeats Dorothea Douglass Lambert Chambers (GB) 6–1 6–4
France
 French Men's Singles Championship – Max Decugis (France) defeats Robert Wallet (France): details unknown
 French Women's Singles Championship – Comtesse de Kermel (France) defeats d'Elva (France): details unknown
USA
 American Men's Singles Championship – William Larned (USA) defeats Robert LeRoy (USA) 6–2 6–2 6–4
 American Women's Singles Championship – Evelyn Sears (USA) defeats Carrie Neely (USA) 6–3 6–2
Davis Cup
 1907 International Lawn Tennis Challenge –  3–2  at Warple Road (grass) London, United Kingdom

References

 
Sports by year